Pure Energy was an American disco and post-disco music group best known for their various club hits such as "You've Got the Power", "Breakaway" and "Love Game". The band comprised Curtis Hudson, Lisa Stevens, Raymond Hudson, and Wade Hudson.

Two members of the group, Curtis Hudson and Lisa Stevens, also wrote a song titled "Holiday", released by Madonna in 1983.

History
The group first signed to Prism Records in 1980 to record a disco and R&B- influenced eponymous album  which spawned two singles, namely "Party On" in 1980 and "You've Got the Power" in 1982.

In 1982, the group released "Breakaway" and "Too Hot" which entered the Billboard Dance charts, both written by Raymond Hudson, Curtis Hudson, and Lisa Stevens.

In 1983, they recorded two Italo disco-influenced boogie songs, "Spaced Out" and "Love Game". Although not charted, Billboard magazine listed "Spaced Out" among its Top Single Picks in the "recommended" section. The second song, however, peaked at number #30 on the Billboard Dance chart. "Love Game" was remixed by Morales and Munzibai.

In 1984, they recorded a freestyle song titled "One Hot Night", written by the group members.

Shortly after their final release, Pure Energy split up.

Discography

Studio albums

Singles

Other singles

References

American dance music groups
American contemporary R&B musical groups
Musical groups established in 1980
Musical groups disestablished in 1984
American disco groups
American boogie musicians
American freestyle music groups